Leyden, or Leiden, is a city and municipality in South Holland, Netherlands.

Leyden or Leiden may also refer to:

Places in the United States
 Leyden, Colorado
 Leyden, Massachusetts
 Leyden, New York
 Leyden, Wisconsin
 Leyden Street, Plymouth, Massachusetts
 Leyden Township, Cook County, Illinois
 Port Leyden, New York, a village partly within the Town of Leyden, New York

People
 John of Leiden (1509–1536), Dutch Anabaptist leader
 Bill Leyden (1917–1970), American television personality
 John Leyden (1775–1811), British orientalist
 Matt Leyden (c.1904–1975), Canadian ice hockey administrator
 Norman Leyden (1917–2014), American conductor, composer and musician
 Ernst Viktor von Leyden (1832–1910), German physician
 Lucas van Leyden (1494–1533), Dutch engraver and painter

Science and medicine
 Leyden jar, a device for storing electric charge invented in 1745
 Leyden papyrus X (P. Leyden X), a 3rd-century papyrus codex written in Greek
 Leiden scale, a temperature scale
 Factor V Leiden, a variant of human factor V that causes a hypercoagulability disorder
 Papyrus Leiden 334, an Egyptian hieratic papyrus made during the Nineteenth Dynasty

Sports
 B.S. Leiden, a basketball club based in Leiden, Netherlands
 ZVL Leiden, a water polo club in Leiden, Netherlands

Other uses
 Leyden cheese, a spiced cheese made in the Netherlands
 Leiden Conventions, an established set of rules, symbols, and brackets used to indicate the condition of an epigraphic or papyrological text in a modern edition
 The Leiden school, a school of thought in linguistics
 Leiden University, Leiden and The Hague, South Holland, Netherlands
 Leyden High School District 212, Cook County, Illinois
 USS Leyden, the name of United States Navy ships

See also